This is a list of protected areas in Armenia that are categorized as follows: 4 national parks, 3 state reserves, 27 state sanctuaries and 5 botanical gardens.

National parks

State reserves

State wildlife sanctuaries

Botanical gardens

References

Armenia
 
Armenia
Protected areas